Carlos Romaña (born 10 November 1999) is a Colombian football player who plays as defender for Danubio.

Career

Club career
In February 2020, Romaña moved to Delfines del Este FC in the Dominican Republic. However, at the end of the same month, he was loaned out to Uruguayan club C.S.D. Villa Española.

On 15 December 2020, Romaña signed with Uruguayan Primera División club Danubio.

References

External links

1999 births
Living people
Colombian footballers
Colombian expatriate footballers
Categoría Primera A players
Uruguayan Primera División players
Boyacá Chicó F.C. footballers
Villa Española players
Danubio F.C. players
Association football defenders
Colombian expatriate sportspeople in the Dominican Republic
Colombian expatriate sportspeople in Uruguay
Expatriate footballers in the Dominican Republic
Expatriate footballers in Uruguay
Sportspeople from Antioquia Department